

Regular season
In the 2004-05 season, Ouellette was a factor on more than 60 percent of goals scored by the Bulldogs. Among the top nine scorers on the Bulldogs, she had nine penalties, which were the fewest. Throughout her NCAA career, she never had double digits in penalties.
November 9, 2004: Riitta Schaublin is named the USCHO.com Defensive Player of the Week. She stopped 63 of 67 shots in a two-game sweep of the Wisconsin Badgers.
November 23, 2004: For the second time in the season, Riitta Schaublin is named USCHO.com Defensive Player of the Week. Against the Minnesota Golden Gophers, Schaublin recorded 62 saves.

Player stats

Skaters
Note: GP= Games played; G= Goals; A= Assists; PTS = Points; GW = Game Winning Goals; PPL = Power Play Goals; SHG = Short Handed Goals

Goaltenders

Awards and honors
 November 9, 2004: Riitta Schaublin is named the USCHO.com Defensive Player of the Week
 November 23, 2004: Riitta Schaublin is named USCHO.com Defensive Player of the Week 
 March 3, 2005: Caroline Ouellette is named UMD's first ever WCHA Student-Athlete of the Year, while also earning a spot on the All-WCHA First Team with Riitta Schaublin. Julianne Vasichek and Noemie Marin are named to the Second Team, and Rachael Drazan is an All-Rookie Team selection. 
Ouellette, Marin, Schaublin, and Vasichek are joined by Jessica Koizumi, Jills Sales, Meghan Stotts, Nora Tallus, and Suvi Vacker on the All-Academic Team.
 March 6, 2005: Caroline Ouellette is named to the WCHA All-Tournament Team.
 March 14, 2005: Caroline Ouellette becomes the second Bulldog to be named a Patty Kazmaier Top-3 Finalist.
 March 23, 2005: Caroline Ouellette is honored with the USCHO.com Sportsmanship Award and Second Team selection, while Riitta Schaublin is named the sites Most Improved Player and a First Team selection. Julianne Vasichek is named to the Third Team, and Rachael Drazan is an All-Rookie Team pick.
 March 28, 2005: Caroline Ouellette is named a CCM All-America First Team selection for the second straight season. Julianne Vasichek is named to the second team, also for the second straight season.

References

External links
Official site

Minnesota-Duluth
Minnesota Duluth Bulldogs women's ice hockey seasons